Şenay Yüzbaşıoğlu (née Ekiz, 19 January 1947– 4 January 2013), commonly known as Şenay, was a Turkish singer-songwriter.

Life
Şenay Ekiz was born in Istanbul in 1947. In 1970, she married Şerif Yüzbaşıoğlu, a musician. Following her marriage she became one of the most active singers of Turkey. In addition to music, she made a name in politics by supporting Bülent Ecevit, the leader of the Republican People's Party.

After her husband's death in 1981, she almost abandoned music. She spent her last days in her brother's house in İstanbul, and died of respiratory failure on 4 January 2013. She was survived by a brother and a sister, Halil İbrahim Ekiz and Şaziye Çataloğlu, respectively.

Career
Although she began singing in 1969, her first hit, Sev Kardeşim (a cover to the Israeli song veShuv Itchem) was in 1971, and became the song of the year. She produced a series of singles, among which Hayat Bayram Olsa and Açıl Susam Açıl were most popular ones. In 1975, she represented Turkey in the Golden Orpheus international song contest in Bulgaria, where she ranked third.

She tried to participate twice, in the national finals of the Eurovision Song Contests. But in 1975, she withdrew due to her husband's membership in the professional jury. In 1981, she dropped the project after the death of her husband. The song Bigudi was sung by Füsun Önal in the contest and became the second after the song by Ayşegül Aldinç and the Modern Folk Üçlüsü. One of her songs, "Honki Ponki", released in 1980, was a protest song.  "Honki Ponki" appeared in the record charts of various European countries.

45 rpm discography

Album discography

References

1947 births
2013 deaths
Deaths from respiratory failure
Singers from Istanbul
Turkish women singers
Turkish singer-songwriters